Burgis may refer to:

Matīss Burģis, Latvian table tennis player
Edward Ambrose Burgis, historian and theologian
Burgis Beach, Saskatchewan, Canada
Thomas Burgis II House, Guilford, Connecticut
The Burji dynasty

See also
Burgi (disambiguation)
Burji (disambiguation)